Aḥmad b. Ibrāhīm b. Muḥammad al-Dimashqī al-Dumyāṭī, commonly known as Ibn al-Naḥḥās al-Dimashqī al-Dumyāṭī (died 1411), was an Islamic scholar and a mujahid who was killed fighting the Byzantine army.  His birth was not known. At the time of death he was in Egypt.

The scholar Ibn Hajar al-Asqalani, the author of the great commentary on Bukhari, wrote that "He was inseparable from Jihad in the front line of Dumyat, and this is a perfect and excellent quality".

Al-sakhawi writes, "He strove in doing good, and preferred obscurity, he did not become proud because of his knowledge, on the contrary maybe those who did not know him would think him to be a commoner, with his pleasant appearance, beautiful beard, stocky and even body, he participated much in Ribat and Jihad until he was martyred".

Abu Imaad States: “The sheikh, the Imam, the scholar and the example.”

During the year of 814 hijri, the Roman army attacked the people of At-Teenah, a village in Egypt, and the people of Dumyat marched to their help, the most notable of them being Ibn al-Nahhas. There then flared an immense battle between the two sides and Ibn al-Nahhas was killed whilst attacking the enemy.

Abdullah Yusuf Azzam who is commonly noted as being responsible for the revival of jihad in the twentieth century, referred to Ibn al-Nahhas' most famous piece of work as the best books he has read.

Pakistani jihadist Masood Azhar has written a 850-page commentary on his Mashāriʻal-Ashwāq ilʹa-Maṣariʻ al-ʻUshshāq.

Most famous work
 Mashari al-Ashwaq ila Masari al-Ushaaq.        
 Kitab ul Jihad.

References

Sunni Muslim scholars of Islam
15th-century Muslim scholars of Islam
15th-century jurists